Lesley Vance (born 1977, Milwaukee, Wisconsin) is an American artist based in Los Angeles.

Early life and education
Vance attended the University of Wisconsin–Madison and California Institute of the Arts.

Career
Vance initially painted still lifes, but is more recently known for her intimately sized improvisational oil paintings. Art in America described her work as "a distinctive sort of illusionistic abstraction, its visual presence a balance between elusive secret and seductive fact". Her work is "rooted in the liquidity of paint and the balletic, improvisational movements of the hand".

Exhibitions
Solo presentations include: Bowdoin College Museum of Art, Brunswick (2012); The FLAG Art Foundation, New York (2012); the Huntington Library, Art Collections (with Ricky Swallow); Botanical Gardens, San Marino (2012), Xavier Hufkens Gallery, Brussels, Belgium (2012, 2014 and 2017). and the David Kordanksy Gallery, Los Angeles (2013).

Vance's work was also included in the 2010 Whitney Biennial, New York Her work can be found in the collection of the Museum of Modern Art, Whitney Museum of American Art, Metropolitan Museum of Art, Los Angeles County Museum of Art and Hammer Museum, among others.

Art market
Vance has been represented by David Kordansky Gallery since 2003. She also works with Xavier Hufkens.

References

1977 births
Living people
Artists from Los Angeles
Artists from Milwaukee
University of Wisconsin–Madison alumni
California Institute of the Arts alumni
Painters from Wisconsin
21st-century American women artists
21st-century American painters
American women painters